
Łęczna County is a unit of territorial administration and local government (powiat) in Lublin Voivodeship, eastern Poland. It was established on January 1, 1999, as a result of the Polish local government reforms passed in 1998.

As of 2019, its total population is 57,372, out of which the population of Łęczna is 18,884 and the rural population is 38,488.

Neighbouring counties
Łęczna County is bordered by Parczew County to the north, Włodawa County and Chełm County to the east, Świdnik County to the south-west, Lublin County to the west, and Lubartów County to the north-west.

Administrative division
The county is subdivided into six gminas (one urban-rural and five rural). These are listed in the following table, in descending order of population.

Popular Culture
The county is a featured locale in the Codemasters racing game DiRT Rally 2.0.

References

 
Land counties of Lublin Voivodeship